Chaudhry Iftikhar Hussain Chhachhar is a Pakistani politician who was a Member of the Provincial Assembly of the Punjab, from 2002 to 2007, from May 2013 to May 2018 and from August 2018 to January 2023

Early life and education
He was born on 10 July 1976 in Okara.

He graduated in 2000 from Punjab Law College and has a degree of Bachelor of Laws LL. B.

Political career
He was elected to the Provincial Assembly of the Punjab as an independent candidate from Constituency PP-188 (Okara-IV) in 2002 Pakistani general election. He received 27,767 votes and defeated Syed Raza Ali Gillani.

He ran for the seat of the Provincial Assembly of the Punjab as an independent candidate from Constituency PP-188 (Okara-IV) in 2008 Pakistani general election but was unsuccessful. He received 16,248 votes and lost the seat to Robina Shaheen Wattoo, an independent candidate. In 2012, he ran for the seat of the National Assembly of Pakistan as an independent candidate from Constituency NA-147 (Okara-V) in by-polls but was unsuccessful. He received 51 votes and lost the seat to Khurram Jahangir Wattoo.

He was re-elected to the Provincial Assembly of the Punjab as a candidate of Pakistan Muslim League (N) (PML-N) from Constituency PP-188 (Okara-IV) in 2013 Pakistani general election. He received 47,222 votes and defeated Manzoor Wattoo.

He was re-elected to Provincial Assembly of the Punjab as a candidate of PML-N from Constituency PP-185 (Okara-III) in 2018 Pakistani general election.

References

Living people
Punjab MPAs 2013–2018
1976 births
Pakistan Muslim League (N) MPAs (Punjab)
Punjab MPAs 2002–2007
Punjab MPAs 2018–2023